This is a timeline documenting events of Jazz in the year 1957.

Events

June
 25 – Ella Fitzgerald started recording the album The Irving Berlin Songbook (June 25 – October 17).
 She won at the 1st Grammy Awards in the category Best Jazz Performance, Individual for this album.

July
 4 – The 5th Newport Jazz Festival started in Newport, Rhode Island (July 4 – 7).

Unknown dates
Carla Bley (born Borg in 1936) was married to Paul Bley.

Album releases

Art Blakey: Orgy In Rhythm
Kenny Burrell: All Day Long 
John Coltrane: Blue Train 
Miles Davis: Miles Ahead 
Curtis Fuller: The Opener (Blue Note)
Johnny Griffin: A Blowin' Session
Milt Jackson: Soul Brothers 
Jay Jay Johnson: Blue Trombone 
Stan Kenton: Kenton with Voices 
Yusef Lateef: Jazz Mood
John Lewis: The John Lewis Piano 
Herbie Mann: Flute Soufflé 
Charles Mingus: Tijuana Moods 
Hank Mobley: Hank Mobley Quintet 
Thelonious Monk: Brilliant Corners
Art Pepper: Meets the Rhythm Section 
Tito Puente: Top Percussion 
Max Roach: Jazz in ¾ Time 
Sonny Rollins: 
Way Out West 
The Sound of Sonny
Art Taylor: Taylor's Wailers 
Ben Webster:
Soulville 
Tenor Giants

Standards

Deaths

 January
 9 – Cripple Clarence Lofton, American boogie-woogie pianist and singer (born 1887).
 18 – George Girard, New Orleans trumpeter (born 1930).
 20 – Dean Benedetti, Italian-American saxophonist (born 1922).

 February
 7 – Sonny Parker, American singer, dancer, and drummer (born 1925).

 March
 12 – Robert Graettinger, American composer (born 1923).
 25 – Fud Livingston, American clarinetist, saxophonist, arranger and composer (born 1906).

 June
 12 – Jimmy Dorsey, American clarinetist, saxophonist, trumpeter, composer, big-band leader (born 1904).
 25 – Curtis Mosby, American jazz drummer, bandleader, and businessman (born 1888).

 July
 16 –  Serge Chaloff, American baritone saxophonist (born 1923).

 August
 2 – Joe Shulman, American upright bassist (born 1923).
 28 – Erik Tuxen, Danish big-band leader, composer, and arranger (born 1902).

 September
 12 – Louis Mitchell, American drummer and bandleader (born 1885).

 October
 9 – Carroll Dickerson, American violinist and bandleader (born 1895).
 23 – Abe Lyman, American bandleader (born 1897).

 November
 17 – Wooden Joe Nicholas, American trumpeter and cornetist (born 1883).
 26 – Jack Gardner, American pianist (born 1903).
 30 – Richard McPartland, American violin, banjo, and guitar player (born 1905).

 December
 20 – Walter Page, American multi-instrumentalist and bandleader (born 1900).
 29 – Ernie Henry, American saxophonist (born 1926).

 Unknown date
 He Dasha, Chinese musician (born 1897).

Births

 January
 1 – Issei Noro, Japanese guitarist and composer, Casiopea.
 5
 Maartin Allcock, British multi-instrumentalist, Fairport Convention, Jethro Tull (died 2018).
 Myra Melford, American pianist and composer.
 7 – Clarence Seay, American upright bassist and composer.
 18 – Bert Joris, Belgian trumpeter, composer, and arranger.
 20 – Andy Sheppard, British saxophonist and composer.
 25 – Sophia Domancich, French pianist and composer.

 February
 6
 Ferenc Snétberger, Hungarian guitarist.
 Faith Nolan, American singer-songwriter and guitarist.
 Simon Phillips, English drummer, songwriter, and producer.
 11 – Oddmund Finnseth, Norwegian upright bassist, composer, and music teacher.
 13 – Inger Marie Gundersen, Norwegian singer and composer.
 14 – Tommy Campbell, American drummer.
 15 – Herlin Riley, American drummer.
 25 – Aage Tanggaard, Danish drummer and record producer.
 26 – Ian Villafana, American guitarist and songwriter.

 March
 3 – Mike Smith, American saxophonist.
 8
 Billy Childs, American pianist.
 William Edward Childs, American composer and pianist.
 9 – Thomas Chapin, American composer, saxophonist, and multi-instrumentalist (died 1998).
 10 – Mino Cinelu, French drummer.
 14 – Vanessa Rubin, American vocalist and composer.
 30 – Dave Stryker, American guitarist.

 April
 1 – Matt Kendrick, American upright bassist and composer.
 4 – Tom McClung, American pianist and composer (died 2017).
 24 – Hanna Banaszak, Polish singer and poet.
 25 – Nestor Torres, Puerto Rican flautist.
 28 – Adrian Utley, English guitarist and producer, Portishead.

 May
 2 – Markus Stockhausen, German trumpet player.
 10 – Carleen Anderson, American singer.
 11 – Manfred Hausleitner, Austrian drummer.
 12 – Jason Kao Hwang, Chinese-American violinist and composer.
 14 – Martin Litton, British pianist.
 29 – Lynne Arriale, American pianist.

 June
 2 – Bobby Sanabria, American drummer, percussionist, composer, and producer.
 5 – John Fumo, American trumpeter.
 12 – Geri Allen, American pianist and composer (died 2017).
 17 – Tom Varner, American hornist and composer.
 20 – Rick Lazaroff, Canadian bassist.
 24 – Luis Salinas, Argentine guitarist.
 28 – Annette A. Aguilar, American percussionist, bandleader, and music educator.

 July
 7 – Hayes Greenfield, American saxophonist, composer, producer, filmmaker, bandleader, and educator.
 12
 Eddie Allen, American trumpeter and flugel hornist.
 Fredrik Carl Størmer, Norwegian drummer.
 18 – Lynn Seaton, American upright bassist.
 21 – George Landress, American mixer, musical engineer, and producer.
 22 – Harri Stojka, Viennese guitarist.
 31 – Mamdouh Bahri, Tunisian guitarist.

 August
 4
 Arto Tunçboyacıyan, Turkish-Armenian percussionist, vocalist, and duduk, sazabo, and bular player, Night Ark.
 Jose Valdes, American pianist and bandleader.
 9 – Danilo Rea, American pianist.
 10 – Fred Ho, American baritone saxophonist, composer, bandleader (died 2014).
 17 – Rabih Abou-Khalil, Lebanese oud player and composer.
 24 – Steve Berry, English upright bassist, cellist, and violinist, Mike Westbrook Orchestra.
 30 – Gerald Albright, American saxophonist and multi-instrumentalist.

 September 
 7 – Anders Jormin, Swedish upright bassist and composer.
 11 – James McBride, American writer and musician.
 16 – Anca Parghel, Romanian singer (died 2008).
 18
 Emily Remler, American guitarist (died 1990).
 John Fedchock, American trombonist, bandleader, and arranger.
 19 – Tatsu Aoki, Japanese upright bassist and record producer.
 24 – Sibongile Khumalo, South African singer.
 25 – Barbara Lahr, German singer, composer, bassist, guitarist, and producer, De Phazz.
 27 – Jerry Weldon, American tenor saxophonist.
 28 – Ernst-Wiggo Sandbakk, Norwegian drummer.

 October
 3 – Bogdan Holownia, Polish pianist.
 4
 Yngve Moe, Norwegian bass guitarist Dance with a Stranger (died 2013).
 Wolter Wierbos, Dutch trombonist.
 5 – Clifton Anderson, American trombonist.
 7 – Morten Halle, Norwegian saxophonist.
 8 – Eerik Siikasaari, Finnish upright bassist, Trio Töykeät.
 8 – Andrés Boiarsky, Argentine alto and tenor saxophonist.
 10 – Pamela Fleming, American trumpeter, flugelhornist, and composer.
 11 – George Letellier, American pianist and composer.
 13 – Future Man, multi-instrumentalist, composer, and inventor, Béla Fleck and the Flecktones.
 20 – Anouar Brahem, Tunisian oud player and composer.
 21 – Ted Gioia, American jazz critic and music historian.
 25 – Arthur Rhames, American guitarist, tenor saxophonist and pianist (died 1989).
 27 – Manu Katché, French drummer and songwriter.

 November
 2 – Gebhard Ullmann, German flautist, saxophonist, and composer.
 4
 Éric Le Lann, French trumpeter.
 Najee, American saxophonist and flautist.
 13
 Roger Ingram, American trumpet player, educator, and author.
 Tetsuo Sakurai, Japanese bassist, Casiopea.
 15 – Kevin Eubanks, American guitarist and composer.
 27 – Judy Carmichael, American pianist and vocalist.
 29 – Jennifer Batten, American guitarist.

 December
 1 – Chris Poland, American guitarist.
 4 – Phillip Barham, American saxophonist.
 10 – Paul Hardcastle, British composer, musician, producer, songwriter, radio presenter, and multi-instrumentalist
 14 – Runar Tafjord, Norwegian French horn player.
 19 – Eric Marienthal, American saxophonist
 21 – Roberto Ottaviano, Italian saxophonist.
 26 – Guy Barker, English trumpeter and composer.

 Unknown date
 Jimmy Earl, American bass guitarist.
 John Kenny, British trombonist, actor, and composer.
 Ray Kennedy, American pianist (died 2015).
 Tom McDermott, pianist and composer.
 Tom Rainey, American drummer.

See also

 1950s in jazz
 List of years in jazz
 1957 in music

References

Bibliography

External links 
 History Of Jazz Timeline: 1957 at All About Jazz

Jazz
Jazz by year